Daphnia jollyi is a species of crustaceans in the genus Daphnia. It is endemic to Western Australia, where it lives in shallow freshwater pools over granite bedrock. Daphnia jollyi is listed as a vulnerable species on the IUCN Red List.

References

Cladocera
Freshwater crustaceans of Australia
Vulnerable fauna of Australia
Taxonomy articles created by Polbot
Crustaceans described in 1973